The Peninsula Theatre was a movie palace in Burlingame, California, that ran from 1926 to 1974.  In 1957, the name was changed to Fox Burlingame.  The theater was shuttered in 1974 and demolished in 1975 to make way for a shopping mall.

History 
The Peninsula Theatre was located at 1415 Burlingame Avenue, Burlingame, California. It opened October 12, 1926 – toward the end of the silent film era.  It was the sixth of a chain of theaters operated by The Peninsula Theaters Corporation and was intended to replace the Garden Burlingame.  The other five were all located on the San Francisco Peninsula.

Design and construction was commissioned by Peninsula Theatres Corporation doing business as Ellis J. Arkush Entertainment, a privately held California enterprise headed by Ellis J. Arkush, his brother, Frank Arkush, and an attorney, Eph Karelsen.

On December 28, 1925, prior to opening the Peninsula Theatre, Ellis J. Arkush sold a 50% interest, billed as a million dollar merger, in all his theaters, to West Coast Theatres, Inc., which, then, was the largest cinema theater company in the western North America.  But Ellis, under the auspices of Peninsula Theatres Corporation, retained active management of the Peninsula Theatre.  Policy and direction of the other theaters were assigned to Archie M. Bowles (né Archer Mckee Bowles; 1889–1944), General Manager of the Northern Branch of West Coast Theatres.

The opening on October 12, 1926, premiered the silent film, Upstage, and included an appearance by comedian Charley Chase.  Also, the $50,000 Robert-Morton theater organ was played by Elbert La Chelle (né Elbert George Lachelle; 1905–1990), pronounced "la shell," and Elmer Vincent (né William Elmer Vincent; 1893–1952). Milt Franklyn and his nine-piece band was the founding house band.

The Peninsula Theatre hosted vaudeville on Saturday nights.

An audience of about 250 attended Fox Burlingame's final showing, a double-feature – Chinatown and The New Centurions — Saturday, September 14, 1974.  Beverly Brehmer (née Beverly June Brehmer; born 1929) was the theater manager.

Peninsula Theatres Corporation 
Peninsula Theatres Corporation doing business as Ellis J. Arkush Entertainment, a privately held California enterprise headed by Ellis J. Arkush, his brother, Frank Arkush, and an attorney, Eph Karelsen.

Original theater (1926)

1927 
The Peninsula Theatre was originally designed for both (i) vaudeville stage shows and (i) silent movies. The original Peninsula Theatre had 2,000 seats and was ornately Spanish baroque in style, featuring staircases in the lobby ascending between pillars inset with mosaic-like panels depicting animals.

Theater organ 
Make
 Robert Morton Organ Company of San Francisco and New York
 Opus (number not known; likely range: 2293–2412)

Only the third of its type and size to be installed in a Pacific Coast theater.

Pipes
 A thousand thirty-three pipes capable of producing orchestral instrument sounds that included the tuba, English horn, concert flute, viola, violin, kinura, oboe, clarinet, and bass violin.  For accompaniment music, the organ had diapason tibia plena, voix céleste, and vox humana – for the human voice. It also had a harp marimba, chrysoglott harp, orchestral bells, glockenspiel, chimes, xylophone, bass drum, tympani, cymbal, crash cymbal, snare drum, tom tom, castanets, tambourine, triangle, and sleigh bells.

Console
 Solid mahogany 3-manual and pedal console
 13 ranks
 153 stops in the stoprail
 Manual compass (chromatic range) is 61 keys
 Pedal compass had 32 notes
 Possibly a "Carlsted" console, named for Morton's head draftsman, Paul Simon Carlsted (1891–1982)

Mechanical
 Electro-pneumatic action (chests) with individual expression shutters controlled various shadings
 More than 1,500 electromagnets operated the valve mechanism

Power
 Centrifugal blower driven by a 10-horsepower motor, voiced on 15-inch wind pressure (a size capable of delivering air at 1900 C.F.M. – cubic feet per minute) ("Orgoblo" centrifugal blower manufactured by The Spencer Turbine Co. of Hartford)
 A 70-ampere, 10-volt generator, driven by a 2-horsepower provided the voltage for the magnets that operate the valve mechanism
 A special 24-inch vacuum blower, powered by a 1-horsepower motor, supplied the exhaust air for the piano mechanism
 All motors were controlled by switches from the console

Piano
 A piano, placed in a separate compartment in the orchestra pit, was also controlled from the console

Installation engineer
 Leo F. Schoenstein (né Leo Ferdinand Schoenstein; 1878–1951), under the auspices of Schoenstein & Co. of San Francisco – technician for the Morgan Organ Company – personally directed the installation.

Current status
 Dismantled and dispersed (circa 2007); was in possession of Dale Merrill Haskin (1942–2007), a collector of theater organs, late of Portland, Oregon, who also owned the San Francisco Orpheum organ.  Much of Haskin's collection is now with the Columbia River Theatre Organ Society of Portland.

Housing for the organ pipes
 The auditorium featured a massive plasterwork proscenium, and was flanked on both sides with arched organ fronts for the expression chambers.

Theater renovation (1957) 
In 1957, Fox West Coast Theatres, then the owners, spent $100,000 renovating the theater, this time 1808 seats and was reopened with an extravagant ceremony on the evening of August 16, 1957, and henceforth was named the Fox Burlingame.  For many years, the theatre's roof featured a two-sided lightbulb sign, with incandescent fireworks, similar to that which still survives atop the Grand Lake Theatre in Oakland.  The Fox Burlingame Theater closed September 14, 1974, and was demolished the following year to make way for the Fox Mall, a shopping center developed by two investors – Mario Castro and Joseph Karp. The Fox Mall was built and dedicated in 1979.

Ownership 
Ellis John Arkush, a native of New York and 1910 graduate of Columbia University (civil engineering), entered the theater business in Redwood City in 1914 where he built the Sequoia Theater.  He added the Variety and Stanford Theatres in Palo Alto, the Peninsula Theatre, and the San Mateo Theatre in San Mateo.  Ellis Arkush was the president of Peninsula Theatres Corporation. The entire chain was sold in 1929 to Fox West Coast Theatres.

Selected personnel

Management 
Peninsula Theatres Corporation dba Ellis J. Arkush Entertainment
 Ellis John Arkush (1888–1974), President of Peninsula Theatres Corporation, also brother of Frank
 Frank Ephriam Arkush (1884–1947), brother of Ellis
 Eph Karelsen (né Ephraim Adolphus Karelsen; 1871–1956), attorney and Arkush's maternal cousin
 Ray Kelsall (né Ray Roland Kelsall; 1889–1953), founding business manager who, before had been manager of the Garden Theatre. He had a staff of 22 – including

 W.H. Augustus, Jr., house manager
 Hale Warn (né Hale Knowlton Warn; 1910–1979), head usher
 Walter Hawthorne Farley (1890–1960), chief operator (projectionist)
 Andrew Hillgard, assistant operator
 F. H. Thomason (né Floyd Harris Thomason; 1896–1976), stage manager, and later, projectionist
 Dorothy Durant (née Josephine E. Durant; 1904–1953), cashier
 Agnes Durant (née Agnes Magdalen Durant; 1909–1992), assistant cashier (Dorothy's younger sister)

Fox West Coast Theatres (beginning 1957)
 "Billie" Tannehill (né William Jackson Tannehill; 1925–2001), theater manager in Burlingame from about 1955 to 1967.  He later managed the Century 21 Theatre in San Jose, which opened in 1963 and closed in 2014.  He was survived by his wife, Marlene Grace Murphy (maiden; 1936–2011), and three children.  Tannehill started managing theaters in the late 1940s, after serving in the Navy during World War II.  He managed theaters for Fox West Coast, Mann Theatres, and finished his career with Century Theatres, spending the last 17 years at Century 21.
 Ward Stoopes (né Ward Farmiloe Stoopes; 1926–1999), a theater manager in the San Francisco area who began his career at Fox Burlingame
 Beverly Brehmer (née Beverly June Brehmer; born 1929), manager at the Fox Burlingame when it closed September 14, 1974, had worked for Fox West Coast Theatres since the late 1950s

Entertainers 
 Milt Franklyn (né Milton J. Franklyn; 1897–1962)

Photo links 
Photos from the Los Angeles Public Library, all dated 1945:
 1 Marquee LAPL00071370 (Los Angeles Public Library call number)
 2 Lobby stairs LAPL00071371
 3 Lobby LAPL00071372
 4 Lobby LAPL00071373
 5 Proscenium LAPL00071374 
 6 Marquee, front LAPL00071375 
 7 Marquee, front LAPL00071376
 8 The Peninsula in 1930, San Francisco Chronicle file photo

Projection equipment 
In the beginning of 1929, the Peninsula was operating two 35 mm Fulco projectors, Ernemann design, manufactured by E.E. Fulton Company of Chicago – Carl Henry Fulton (1896–1947), President and son of the firms namesake, Elmer E. Fulton (1861–1921).

See also 
 Fox Theatres

Miscellaneous 
The Golden State Theatre houses a number of items saved from other theaters, which happened to match items which were missing, including one stained glass exit sign from the Peninsula Theatre.

Notes and references

Notes

References

External links
 Fox Burlingame at Cinema Treasures

Event venues established in 1926
Theatres completed in 1926
Burlingame, California
Theatres in the San Francisco Bay Area
Cinemas and movie theaters in the San Francisco Bay Area
Cinemas and movie theaters in California
Former cinemas in the United States
Demolished theatres in California
Commercial buildings completed in 1926
Buildings and structures demolished in 1975
1920s architecture in the United States
Public venues with a theatre organ
History of San Mateo County, California
Weeks and Day buildings